St. Phillip School is a historic school building for African American students located near Eastover, Richland County, South Carolina. It was built in 1938, and is a one-story, three room school.  The building is clad in shiplap weatherboard and rests on brick piers. The school closed in 1959.

It was added to the National Register of Historic Places in 1996.

References 

African-American history of South Carolina
School buildings on the National Register of Historic Places in South Carolina
School buildings completed in 1938
Buildings and structures in Richland County, South Carolina
National Register of Historic Places in Richland County, South Carolina